Frontiers of Biogeography is a peer-reviewed open access scientific journal publishing biogeographical science, with the academic standards expected of a journal operated by and for an academic society. It published on behalf of the International Biogeographical Society, using the eScholarship Publishing platform. The current editor-in-chief is Robert J. Whittaker.

Abstracting and indexing 
The journal is abstracted and indexed in:

References

External links 
 

Open access journals
Ecology journals
Geography journals
Biogeography
Publications established in 2009
English-language journals